Kuchak is a village in the Aparan Municipality of the Aragatsotn Province of Armenia. It was founded in 1829-30 and named after Nahapet Kuchak, a 16th-century Armenian poet.

References 

World Gazetteer: Armenia – World-Gazetteer.com
Report of the results of the 2001 Armenian Census

Populated places in Aragatsotn Province
Erivan Governorate
Populated places established in 1829